Andreas Ottosson (born 28 August 1971) is a retired Swedish football striker.

References

1971 births
Living people
Swedish footballers
Östers IF players
Tromsø IL players
IK Start players
IFK Värnamo players
IFK Hässleholm players
Association football forwards
Swedish expatriate footballers
Expatriate footballers in Norway
Swedish expatriate sportspeople in Norway
Allsvenskan players
Eliteserien players